The decentralized partially observable Markov decision process (Dec-POMDP)   is a model for coordination and decision-making among multiple agents. It is a probabilistic model that can consider uncertainty in outcomes, sensors and communication (i.e., costly, delayed, noisy or nonexistent communication). 

It is a generalization of a Markov decision process (MDP) and a partially observable Markov decision process (POMDP) to consider multiple decentralized agents.

Definition

Formal definition 
A Dec-POMDP is a 7-tuple , where
  is a set of states,
  is a set of conditional transition probabilities between states,
  is the reward function.
  is a set of conditional observation probabilities , and
  is the discount factor.
At each time step, each agent takes an action , the state updates based on the transition function  (using the current state and the joint action), each agent observes an observation based on the observation function  (using the next state and the joint action) and a reward is generated for the whole team based on the reward function .  The goal is to maximize expected cumulative reward over a finite or infinite number of steps. These time steps repeat until some given horizon (called finite horizon) or forever (called infinite horizon). The discount factor  maintains a finite sum in the infinite-horizon case.

References

External links 
 maspan.org
 The Dec-POMDP page

Markov processes